The Alamein Memorial is a Commonwealth War Graves Commission war memorial in the El Alamein War Cemetery, El Alamein, Egypt. The memorial commemorates 11,866 Commonwealth forces members who died during World War II. The memorial was designed by Hubert Worthington and unveiled by Viscount Montgomery of Alamein on 24 October 1954.

The memorial commemorates a collection of different areas of service and geography. For land forces the memorial largely commemorates those who died during the Western Desert campaign as well as in Syria, Lebanon, Iraq and Iran and have no known grave. For airmen the memorial commemorates those that died in Egypt, Libya, Syria, Lebanon, Iraq, Greece, Crete and the Aegean, Ethiopia, Eritrea, the Somalilands, the Sudan, East Africa, Aden and Madagascar and in service of the Rhodesian and South African Air Training Scheme and have no known grave. The memorial is collocated with El Alamein War Cemetery, which largely contains the graves of men who died at all stages of the Western Desert Campaign.

When designing the memorial, Worthington followed similar principles to First World War memorials, but made modifications on account of the climate and environment in Africa. This included building tall walls to keep out drifting sand, providing shelters from the sun, and planting succulents, including cacti in place of plants more common in Europe.

References

External links
 

Commonwealth War Graves Commission memorials
Western Desert campaign
Buildings and structures completed in 1954
World War II memorials
El Alamein